Yolande Cohen (born 1950) is a Moroccan-born Canadian historian and professor of contemporary history whose research focuses upon History of Youth and the History of Women. A Moroccan Sephardim, she also focuses on the History of Moroccan Jews. In the 1990s, Cohen was a politician, the initial leader of the Coalition Démocratique–Montréal Écologique municipal political party and its candidate for mayor in the 1994 municipal election. Cohen is a Fellow of Royal Society of Canada. Her awards include Knight of the National Order of the Legion of Honour and Knight of the National Order of Québec.

Early life and education 
Yolande Cohen was born in Morocco, 1950. She has younger brothers. She studied in Paris in 1968, then immigrated to Quebec.

Career
Cohen was a lecturer in Rimouski, Quebec, in 1976. In the same year, she worked as a history teacher at the Université du Québec in Montreal. She is involved in the founding of "Vélo Québec, du Regroupement des femmes du Québec et de Montréal écologique". Cohen has also taught at Harvard University, Princeton University, the University of California, Los Angeles, the School for Advanced Studies in the Social Sciences and the Paris Nanterre University.

She is the author of several academic works, including Les jeunes, le Socialisme et la guerre : Histoire des Mouvements de jeunesse en France; Femmes de parole. L’Histoire des Cercles de fermières du Québec; and Femmes philanthropes : Catholiques, Protestantes et Juives dans les Organisations caritatives au Québec. Since its creation in February 2012, Cohen also occasionally writes for HuffPost, Quebec edition, publishing blog posts on various subjects.

In 1994, Coalition démocratique de Montréal merged with Montréal Écologique to become the Coalition Démocratique–Montréal Écologique, a municipal political party that existed till 1998. Cohen was its initial leader and its candidate for mayor in the 1994 municipal election. She was also a candidate for city council in the 1998 Montreal municipal election.

Awards and honours
 2011, Knight of the National Order of the Legion of Honour
 Fellow, Royal Society of Canada. In 2012, she was elected President of the Academy of Arts, Letters and Human Sciences of the Royal Society of Canada.
 2013, Finalist, Women of the Year Competition, organized by the organization Arab Women's Space, in two categories: (a) art and culture, and (b) teaching and research
 2017, Knight of the National Order of Québec

Selected works
 Les Mouvements de jeunesse socialiste en France : espoirs et échecs, 1880-1905, 1978
 Femmes et politique, 1981
 Les thèses universitaires québécoises sur les femmes, 1921-1981, 1983
 Les jeunes, le socialisme et la guerre : histoire des mouvements de jeunesse en France 1989
 Encrages féministes : un moment de réflexion dans la recherche féministe, 1989
 Role of women's movements in enlarging citizenship in Québec, 1997
 Féminismes et identités nationales : les processus d'intégration des femmes au politique, 1998
 Femmes de parole : l'histoire des Cercles de fermières du Québec, 1915-1990, 1990
 Femmes philanthropes : Catholiques, Protestantes et Juives dans les Organisations caritatives au Québec, 2000
 Religion et politique dans les sociétés contemporaines, 2006
 Identités sépharades et modernité, 2007
 Le rôle des mouvements de femmes dans l'élargissement de la citoyenneté au Québec, 2012
 Les Sépharades du Québec : parcours d'éxils nord-africains, 2017

References

1950 births
Living people
Moroccan people
Moroccan emigrants to Canada
20th-century Canadian historians
21st-century Canadian historians
20th-century Canadian non-fiction writers
21st-century Canadian non-fiction writers
20th-century Canadian women writers
21st-century Canadian women writers
Women's studies academics
Jewish Canadian politicians
Jewish Canadian writers
Moroccan-Jewish diaspora